Thorunna is a genus of sea slugs, dorid nudibranchs, shell-less marine gastropod mollusks in the family Chromodorididae.

Description
The genus Thorunna contains chromodorid nudibranchs with a distinctive radula, which is very small and has 17-25 teeth in a half-row. The lateral teeth are long slender shafts with bluntly bifid tips. Species in this genus rarely exceed  and wriggle or vibrate their gills rhythmically. Anatomically the buccal bulb is very small relative to most chromodorids and the oral tube very long.

Species
Species in the genus Thorunna include:

 Species brought into synonymy
 Thorunna decussata (Risbec, 1928) : synonym of Noumea decussata Risbec, 1928: synonym of Verconia decussata (Risbec, 1928)
 Thorunna lapislazuli Bertsch & Ferreira, 1974: synonym of Felimare lapislazuli (Bertsch & Ferreira, 1974)
 Thorunna scottjohnsoni (Bertsch & Gosliner, 1989): synonym of Ardeadoris scottjohnsoni Bertsch & Gosliner, 1989
 Thorunna speciosus Rudman, 1990: synonym of Thorunna speciosa Rudman, 1990
 Thorunna tura (Marcus & Marcus, 1967): synonym of Mexichromis tura (Marcus & Marcus, 1967)

References

Chromodorididae